Small Town Gay Bar is a 2006 documentary film directed by Malcolm Ingram that focuses on two gay bars in the rural deep Southeast United States, one in Shannon, Mississippi, and one in Meridian, Mississippi. The documentary was produced by View Askew Productions with Kevin Smith serving as executive producer.

Synopsis
The story of community in the Deep South that is forced to deal with the struggles of ignorance, hypocrisy and oppression, Malcolm Ingram's Small Town Gay Bar visits two Mississippi communities and bases those visits around two small gay bars, Rumors in Shannon, Mississippi, and Different Seasons/Crossroads in Meridian, Mississippi.

Additionally the film visits Bay Minette, Alabama, to look at the brutal hate crime murder of Scotty Joe Weaver. The film focuses on a group of folks who are less concerned with the national debate over gay marriage than they are with the life risks they take being openly gay in small Southern towns.

Cast
Jim Bishop as himself
Bill Curtis as himself
Rick Gladish as himself
Fred Phelps as himself
Charles Smith as himself
Justin Williams as himself

Quotes
Kevin Smith, executive producer of Small Town Gay Bar and also of "Silent Bob" fame: "It's a film that is a portrait of small-town gay bars in rural Mississippi," Smith said, straightening up. "Which is probably the hardest place in the world to be gay. It's a portrait of how people will create their own community, even in the middle of a community that ostracizes them and wants nothing to do with them. They can still collectively come together and create an oasis for themselves to just chill out and be themselves and be who they can't be in this particular buckle of the Bible Belt."
David Rooney of Daily Variety Magazine: "Ingram illustrates how gay bars function as oases of acceptance and alternative families for his good-humored, enduring subjects."
Philip Martin of Arkansas Democrat-Gazette: "Ingram's movie not only makes it clear that people can be brave and resourceful in the face of intolerance, they can also throw a great party."

Soundtrack
 "Rollin' and Tumblin'" by R. L. Burnside
 "Tired Hands" by K.C. Accidental
 "'Cause Cheap Is How I Feel" by Cowboy Junkies  
 "Mosquito" by Jake Fairley   
 "Anthems for a 17-Year-Old Girl" by Broken Social Scene 
 "Love Is a Place" by Metric    
 "A Million Dead End Jobs" by FemBots   
 "The Rainbow" by Ween
 "The Transit Song" by FemBots   
 "What Comes After One" by FemBots   
 "Animals of Prey" by The Hidden Cameras  
 "At Night" by Jake Fairley   
 "We Oh We" by The Hidden Cameras    
 "Gay Bar" by Electric Six   
 "The Fear Is On" by The Hidden Cameras  
 "Small Town Murder Scene" by FemBots   
 "Broken and Blue" by FemBots   
 "I'm Still Your Fag" by Broken Social Scene   
 "Ban Marriage" by The Hidden Cameras

Reception
Rotten Tomatoes lists five total reviews, and all of them are positive, giving the film a 100% fresh rating.

Awards
2006 Grand Jury Award winner at the Outfest: The Los Angeles Gay and Lesbian Film Festival for Best Documentary
2006 Grand Jury Award winner at the Miami Gay and Lesbian Film Festival for Best Documentary
2006 Nominated for Grand Jury Prize at the Sundance Film Festival
2006 Official Selection at the Sundance Film Festival
2006 Official Selection at the SXSW Film Festival
2008 GLAAD Media Award nomination for Best Documentary

References

External links
Small Town Gay Bar on Myspace
Different Seasons official web site, archived 2009 February 25 by Internet Archive's Wayback Machine

2006 films
American LGBT-related films
Documentary films about LGBT topics
View Askew Productions films
American documentary films
Films shot in Mississippi
Films directed by Malcolm Ingram
LGBT in Alabama
LGBT in Mississippi
Documentary films about Mississippi
Documentary films about Alabama

2000s English-language films
2000s American films